The year 659 BC was a year of the pre-Julian Roman calendar. In the Roman Empire, it was known as year 95 Ab urbe condita . The denomination 659 BC for this year has been used since the early medieval period, when the Anno Domini calendar era became the prevalent method in Europe for naming years.

Events
 The enemy city of Alba Longa is destroyed by the Romans.

References